The Hyundai i20 is a supermini hatchback produced by Hyundai since 2008. The i20 made its debut at the Paris Motor Show in October 2008, and sits between the i10 and i30. The i20 replaces the Getz in nearly all of its markets, while several markets received the slightly larger Accent/Verna hatchback to replace it instead.

Currently, the largest markets for the i20 are Europe and India, with two different variations being developed to cater to each market.



First generation (PB; 2008) 

The Hyundai i20 uses a completely new platform that was created at Hyundai's European technical centre in Rüsselsheim to allow Hyundai to move into Europe's highly competitive subcompact B segment. A  wheelbase helps endow the i20 with a generous passenger cabin. Suspension follows the supermini norm of MacPherson struts at the front and a torsion beam rear end, with rack and pinion steering.

A slightly upgraded version of the i20, called the iGen i20, went on sale in India in March 2012 onward with tweaked headlamps, new front grille, tail lamps and fog lamps. It follows the "Fluidic Sculpture" design philosophy with slightly retuned engines. A new next generation model, known as Elite i20 in India, was launched in India on 11 August 2014 and in Europe in the 2014 Paris Motor Show.

The i20 was not sold in South Korea, North America and the Philippines as those markets have the Accent. The i20 was discontinued in the Indonesian market in 2012 due to the introduction of the Accent hatchback, which is known there as the Grand Avega.

The i20 was produced in Sriperumbudur (near Chennai), India for sale in Asia and Oceania, and later was also assembled in Turkey (İzmit plant) for the European market by CKD kits from India.

Engines
The i20 has a total of seven four cylinder engine options. Four are petrol, including the 1248 cc dohc 16 valve "Aditeya" engine, while the rest are diesel engines.

All diesel engines and 1.2-litre and 1.4-litre petrol engines come mated to five speed manual transmission, there is an option of a four speed automatic for some 1.4-litre petrol engined models, the 1.6-litre is mated to a six speed manual transmission.

In the Indian market, the Hyundai i20 is powered by a 1.2-litre Kappa engine with  power at 5200 rpm and  torque at 4,000 rpm. It also comes with a 1.4-litre gamma gasoline which has  power at 5500 rpm and  torque at 4200 rpm, but is mated only to a four speed automatic transmission. The i20 CRDi diesel has  at 4000 rpm and  torque between 1750 and 2750 rpm, and comes with a six speed manual transmission.

In Australia, the i20 was originally offered as a 1.4 petrol with a $3500 option of the Gamma II G4FC 1.6 petrol engine. The 1.6 makes 91 kW at 6300rpm and 157Nm at 4200rpm. However, with the arrival of the new 1.6 powered Accent in the end of 2011, the 1.6L option on the i20 has been dropped.

In South Africa, the i20 was originally offered in 2009 with either 1.4 (G4FA) or 1.6 (G4FC) engines, with the 1.4 having an optional 4 speed automatic transmission. The facelift model was introduced in the second half of 2012 with only the 1.4 gamma engine initially being offered (the 1.6 engine was discontinued), after which a 1.2 kappa engine, a 1.4 CRDi engine as well as a new 6 speed manual transmission for some 1.4 models was added to the range.

Safety

The Hyundai i20 earned a maximum five star safety rating from Euro NCAP and scored six out of a maximum of seven points in the "safety assist" category, receiving top marks for its belt reminder and electronic stability programme which minimises the risk of skidding by braking individual wheels. The i20 was named one of Euro NCAP's "top five safest cars for 2009", which was based on Euro NCAP's maximum five star awards and their overall score.

The Hyundai i20 features starts with six airbags—for driver and passenger in the front along with side and curtain airbags for rear passengers, whilst the Antilock Brake System (ABS) with Electronic Brake-force Distribution (EBD) which helps to control in slippery surfaces.

Hyundai i20 has new additions in its safety features like rain sensing wipers and automatic darkness sensing headlamps, central locking, impact sensing auto door unlock, keyless entry along with front and rear fog lamps and advanced engine immobilizer.

Despite the high safety rating from NCAP and ANCAP tests the i20 has performed poorly in real world crash data records. Monash University Used Car Safety Ratings Buyer's Guide, which researched over 8 million crashes showed the Hyundai Accent i20 2010–2015 to have a 2 star driver protection rating. https://www.monash.edu/__data/assets/pdf_file/0004/1956514/2019-UCSRs-brochure.pdf

Gallery
Pre-facelift styling

Post-facelift styling

Second generation (GB/IB; 2014) 

The second generation i20 has a new exterior and interior design, and a new 1.4-litre diesel engine.

It was launched in August 2014 in India, and in November 2014 in Europe. The design of the car employs Hyundai's 'Fluidic Sculpture 2.0' design philosophy. The design for the car has been developed at Hyundai's design facilities in Rüsselsheim, Germany.

Some of the design features of the new i20 include trapezoidal fog lamps, black C pillar block, wrap around tail lamps, re worked headlights and the hexagonal front grille. The interiors feature a black and beige dual tone dashboard, multi-steering-mounted audio controls, Bluetooth integrated 2 DIN audio with USB and Aux inputs with 1 GB internal storage, rear AC vents, a dedicated engine start/stop button, and automatic temperature control. The i20 5-door was initially designed with boomerang-shaped tail lights (as visible on spyshots), but the whole rear part of the vehicle has been redesigned before launch.

India (Elite i20; IB) 
The second generation i20 was launched in August 2014 in India as the Elite i20. It eventually won the 2015 Indian Car Of The Year (ICOTY) in December 2014. At launch, ten variants and two engine options are offered in the market. The car also has a higher ground clearance than before, 170 mm as against 165 mm of the old i20. The i20 has 326 litres of boot space.

The i20 is powered by 1.2-litre Kappa Dual VTVT petrol engine and 1.4-litre U2 CRDi diesel engine. The hatchback has safety features such as ABS, dual front airbags and seat belt pretensioners as standard while rear camera with EOM display, headlamp escort function, reverse parking sensors and six airbags are available in higher variants.

Facelift
Launched at the 2018 Auto Expo in India, the car features new front and rear bumpers, new boot lid which now also included rear number plate slot, moved from the rear bumper, and a new tail lamp design. Changes to the interior including the addition of a new infotainment system equipped with Apple CarPlay and Android Auto. The 4-speed torque converter automatic transmission was replaced with a CVT for petrol engine variants.

i20 Active 
A crossover-styled variant called the i20 Active, was launched in India on 17 March 2015 and in Europe at the Frankfurt Motor Show in September 2015. It features front, rear and side black plastic cladding, along with roof rails, rugged-looking fuel cap, and both front and rear aluminum skid plates. The i20 Active also gets cornering lamps, aluminum pedals and roof rails, along with a fuel lid cover. The ground clearance of the Indian-spec i20 Active has been increased to 190 mm, which is a 20 mm gain over the standard i20 at 170 mm.

Powertrain

GB models

IB models

Third generation (BC3/BI3; 2020) 

The third-generation i20 was unveiled online for the European market on 19 February 2020. It was supposed to debut at the 90th Geneva Motor Show in March 2020, but the show and the launch were cancelled due to the COVID-19 pandemic.

The third generation i20 is larger and lower than the previous generation, its design is now employs Hyundai's latest "Sensuous Sportiness" design philosophy, featuring a redesigned exterior and interior styling.

Markets

Europe (BC3) 
After its debut in February 2020, production for the European market commenced in the Izmit plant in Turkey in August 2020. The plant will produce around 85,000 units of i20 per year, covering about 50% of the global i20 production.

The top spec is equipped with two 10.25-inch displays, one for the instrument gauge cluster and one for the main infotainment display. It is also available with an N Line trim and N performance-oriented variant.

In 2021, Hyundai launched the France-only i20 N Line Michel Vaillant limited edition, featuring optional blue and red stickers.

India (BI3) 
The third-generation i20 was launched in the country on 5 November 2020. It dropped the "Elite" prefix from the previous generation, now simply marketed as the "Hyundai i20". It is built on the Hyundai-Kia K2 platform shared with other Hyundai-Kia recent compact cars. It is claimed to make use of 66 percent high-strength steel which improves its crash safety.

On 24 August 2021, Hyundai introduced the N Line variant for the BI3 i20.

Safety

India
The i20 is sold in India with two frontal airbags, antilock brakes, front seatbelt reminders and ISOFIX anchorages standard across the range. Electronic stability control, a tyre pressure monitor, front-seat side thorax airbags and head-protecting curtain airbags are optional on the regular i20 and standard on the i20 N.

The i20 was tested by Global NCAP in the first half of 2022. In the frontal offset crash test into a deformable barrier at 64 km/h, dummy readings showed only adequate protection of the driver's head. The i20 was penalised for unstable structural performance of the passenger compartment and rupture of the driver's footwell, both of which indicate poor integrity of the recorded structural performance. Dummy readings of moderate chest compression and the unstable passenger compartment led to chest protection being rated weak, consequently the i20 could not score points for seatbelt reminders. Structures behind the dashboard could increase risk of knee injury to differently sized or positioned occupants; the unstable passenger compartment and ruptured footwell meant Hyundai were not allowed to demonstrate otherwise. Using the child seats recommended by Hyundai, dynamic performance of the 3 year-old and 18 month-old child occupants was good, but readings of excessive neck tension in the forward-facing three-year old dummy meant that the i20 narrowly missed a four star rating for child occupant protection.

Euro NCAP
The i20 in its standard European configuration received 4 stars from Euro NCAP in 2021.

i20 N 
A performance version called the i20 N was revealed for the European market in October 2020. It slots under the i30 N in the Hyundai N family.

The i20 N is powered by a 1.6-liter turbocharged GDi engine mated to a 6-speed manual transmission.

Its engine delivers peak torque between 1,750 and 4,500 rpm and hits peak power between 5,500 and 6,000 rpm. The broad power band helps its acceleration performance throughout the mid and high-speed range. Although the Gamma engine is featured in other Hyundai models, for the i20 N it is equipped with a bespoke turbocharger and intercooler system.

Changes also include a reinforced the chassis at 12 different points, and a reinforced front domes and knuckles with distinct geometry for the suspension. The camber has also been increased while a new sway bar, new springs, and new shock absorbers have been fitted. The brakes have also been enlarged.

Powertrain

BC3 models

BI3 models

Sales

Motorsport

The Hyundai i20 WRC is a World Rally Car built by Hyundai for use in the 2014 World Rally Championship. It is based on the i20, and was unveiled at the 2012 Paris Motor Show, marking Hyundai's return to the WRC after a ten-year absence. The car will be operated by Hyundai's performance division, Hyundai Motorsport from a base in Frankfurt, Germany.

The i20 WRC made its debut at the Monte Carlo Rally in January 2014.

From 2017 onwards Hyundai i20 Coupe WRC is used in World Rally Championship.

Hyundai i20 R5 is used in World Rally Championship-2 competitions.

Two cars were entered into 2018 FIA World Rallycross Championship, with Niclas Grönholm finishing 7th overall. Four cars were entered in 2019, with Timur Timerzyanov winning in Belgium.

Hyundai i20 Coupe WRC is the current manufacturers' championship leader in 2019 World Rally Championship built by Hyundai Shell Mobis WRT.

References

External links

I20
Subcompact cars
Euro NCAP superminis
Global NCAP superminis
Hatchbacks
Front-wheel-drive vehicles
Cars introduced in 2008
Cars of Turkey
i20
2010s cars
Vehicles with CVT transmission